The second Dumfries and Galloway regional council election was held on 2 May 1978, a year after the second district council elections.

This was the first time the Conservatives and the Scottish National Party (SNP) had contested a regional council election in Dumfries and Galloway. Thatcher's Conservatives overtook Callaghan's Labour to become the opposition to the still dominant independents.

Turnout was down, and so were the number of wards contested. Only 15 of the 35 wards in the region were contested, over half. 57.4% of the electorate of Dumfries and Galloway couldn't vote for this reason.

References

Dumfries
Dumfries and Galloway Council elections